Kalu Sudu Mal is a 2002 Sri Lankan Sinhala romantic drama film directed by Mohan Niyaz and produced by director himself with Amal Rodrigo for Cinemangani Films. It stars Kamal Addararachchi and Dilhani Ekanayake in lead roles along with Linton Semage and Yashoda Wimaladharma. Music is composed by Sarath Wickrama. The film was screened at Film Festivals at Australia and France as well. It is the 1165th Sri Lankan film in the Sinhala cinema.

Before screening in Sri Lanka, the film was screened in Paris and Australia in January 2001.

Plot

Cast
 Kamal Addararachchi as Ravindra Kumara alias Dilip
 Dilhani Ekanayake as Nirmala Mudunkotuwa alias Rohini
 Yashoda Wimaladharma as Mala
 Linton Semage as Chathura
 Veena Jayakody as Pushpa
 Tissa Udangamuwa
 Eardley Wedamuni as Detective head
 Senaka Wijesinghe as Detective assistant
 Sarath Namalgama

References

2002 films
2000s Sinhala-language films